Dişbudak can refer to the following villages in Turkey:

 Dişbudak, Adıyaman
 Dişbudak, Gönen
 Dişbudak, Keşan
 Dişbudak, Lapseki